1,3-Dibromopropane is an organobromine compound with the formula (CH2)3Br2. It is a colorless liquid with sweet odor. It is used in organic synthesis to form C3-bridged compounds such as through C-N coupling reactions.

1,3-Dibromopropane was used in the first cyclopropane synthesis in 1881, known as the Freund reaction.

Synthesis
1,3-Dibromopropane can be prepared via the free radical addition between allyl bromide and hydrogen bromide.

Metabolism
Metabolism of 1,3-dibromopropane was examined in 1981. The examination was done by orally administering 1,3-dibromopropane to rats and collecting results 24 hours after administration. Results were obtained from three sources: urine, faeces, and expired air. Upon analysis of the urinary results, researchers discovered the formation of metabolite, N-acetyl-S-(1-bromo-3-propyl)-cysteine and the decline in the GSH content of the liver of the rats. This led to the assumption that 1,3-dibromopropane could have reacted with GSH after administration and gave rise to 1-bromo-3-propyl-S-glutathione, which ultimately form the urinary metabolite.  Moreover, due to little radioactivity observed from feces and the confirmation from maintained blood levels of radioactivity proved the occurrence of biliary excretion of sulfur-containing metabolites and enterohepatic cycling.

References

Bromoalkanes